Thomas Dean Donnelly and Joshua Oppenheimer are American screenwriters who have collaborated on a number of projects from Thoughtcrimes in 2003 through an adaptation of Brian Freeman's Infinite in 2021.

Filmography
Thoughtcrimes (2003)
Sahara (2005)
A Sound of Thunder (2005)
Dylan Dog: Dead of Night (2011)
Conan the Barbarian (2011)

References

External links

American male screenwriters
Screenwriting duos
Living people
Year of birth missing (living people)